Sir (Robert) Lambert Playfair  (21 March 1828 – 18 February 1899) was a British soldier, diplomat, naturalist and author.

Early life
Lambert Playfair was a grandson of James Playfair, principal of the University of St Andrews, and son of George Playfair (1782–1846), chief inspector-general of hospitals in Bengal, and his wife Jessie Ross. Lambert was born in St Andrews when his parents were at home on leave, and left there to be educated when they returned to India. His elder brother, Lyon, became Lyon Playfair, 1st Baron Playfair. Another brother was Dr William Smoult Playfair, who became involved in a notorious court case, Kitson v. Playfair.

Career and later life
Playfair was a military cadet at Addiscombe College, then joined the Madras Army in 1846 at the age of 18. He became an artillery officer and with the rank of Captain was appointed to the Madras Staff Corps in 1858. He was promoted to Major in 1866, and left the army with the honorary rank of Lieutenant-Colonel in 1867.

Playfair was assistant Political Agent at Aden 1854–62, then Political Agent, then Consul, at Zanzibar 1862–67, and was appointed Consul-General in Algeria in 1867. His territory was extended to Algeria and Tunis in 1885. He was knighted KCMG in the Queen's Birthday Honours of 1886. He retired in 1896 and was given an honorary doctorate by the University of St Andrews. 

He is buried in the churchyard of St Andrews Cathedral with his wife Agnes Webster Ranken (1832–1918) and eldest daughter Agnes Mary Playfair. The grave lies at the foot of his parents' grave.

Publications
A History of Arabia Felix or Yemen from the commencement of the Christian era to the present time; Including an account of the British settlement of Aden (Bombay, 1859)
The Fishes of Zanzibar, with Albert Günther (London, 1866)
Travels in the Footsteps of Bruce in Algeria and Tunis (1877)
Handbook to the Mediterranean: its cities, coasts, and islands (London, 1881)
The Scourge of Christendom: Annals of British relations with Algiers prior to the French Conquest (London, 1884)
Bibliography of the Barbary States, Algeria, Cyrenaica and Morocco (1889)
A Bibliography of Morocco from the Earliest time to the end of 1891 (London, 1892)

Notes

See also
:Category:Taxa named by Lambert Playfair

References
PLAYFAIR, Sir Robert Lambert, Who Was Who, A & C Black, 1920–2015 (online edition, Oxford University Press, 2015)

Archive catalogue: Playfair family, University of St Andrews
Obituary, The Times, London, 20 February 1899, page 10

External links

Portraits, University of St Andrews Photographic Collection
Robert Lambert Playfair and his ‘Account of Aden’: a new acquisition adds to substantial archive, Special Collections of the University of St Andrews

1828 births
1899 deaths
Graduates of Addiscombe Military Seminary
Madras Staff Corps officers
British diplomats
British writers
Knights Commander of the Order of St Michael and St George
People from St Andrews
Fellows of the Royal Geographical Society
Military personnel from Fife